Union Creek may refer to:

Union Creek Historic District
Union Creek, Ontario, a community in Kawartha Lakes
Union Creek, Oregon
Union Creek (Rogue River), a stream in southern Oregon
Union Creek (South Dakota)